Distorzija (Distortion) is the fifth studio album by the Serbian/Yugoslavian new wave band Električni orgazam. It was released in 1986 by Jugoton.

Track listing
All songs are written by Srđan Gojković except where noted. Arranged by Električni Orgazam.

"A" side
	 	"Vudu bluz"
	 	"Lui Lui" (music by Richard Berry, voice — Ivana Korolija)
	 	"Svaka nova noć"
	 	"Ša la la"
	 	"Debela devojka"

"B" side
 		"Ja sam težak kao konj"
	 	"Vidim svoj lik"
	 	"Ne postojim"
	 	"Horor bugi" (music by Čavke and Švaba)
	 	"Hej ti"
	 	"Kapetan Esid"

Legacy
In 2015 Distorzija album cover was ranked 92nd on the list of 100 Greatest Album Covers of Yugoslav Rock published by web magazine Balkanrock.

Personnel
Švaba (Zoran Radomirović) — bass guitar, piano
Čavke (Goran Čavajda) — drums, piano, backing vocals
Banana (Branislav Petrović) — guitar, harmonica, backing vocals
Gile (Srđan Gojković) — vocals, guitar

References

External links

Električni Orgazam albums
1986 albums
Jugoton albums